José María Izuzquiza Herranz (November 22, 1925 – April 26, 2011) was the Catholic bishop of the Apostolic Vicariate of Jaén en Peru, Peru.

Born in Madrid, Spain, Izuzquiza Herranz was ordained to the priesthood for the Society of Jesus in 1958. In 1987 he was appointed bishop retiring in 2001.

Notes

Spanish Roman Catholic bishops in South America
20th-century Roman Catholic bishops in Peru
1925 births
2011 deaths
20th-century Peruvian Jesuits
Jesuit bishops
Roman Catholic bishops of Jaén in Peru